Brosville is a commune in the Eure department in the Normandy region in northern France.

Geography
The Iton river flows through the commune.

Population

See also
Communes of the Eure department

References

Communes of Eure